Poonkiny is a former settlement in Mendocino County, California.

A post office operated at Poonkiny from 1896 to 1900.

It is named after the word for wormwood in the language of the Yuki tribe.

References

Former settlements in Mendocino County, California
Former populated places in California